Dennis Yu Yun-kong (余允抗) is a Hong Kong film director active in the 1980s, and a crucial member of Hong Kong New Wave. He is most famous for directing horror movies.

Filmography

Film 
 1980 The Beasts - Director
 1980 Shi ba - Director
 1981 The Imp - Director
 1984 Crazy Kung Fu Master - Director
 1985 The Musical Singer - Director
 1985 City Hero - Director
 1987 Evil Cat - Director
 1990 Sketch of a Psycho - Director

References

External links
 

Year of birth missing (living people)
Possibly living people
Hong Kong film directors